Rhabdomiris is a genus of true bugs belonging to the family Miridae.

The species of this genus are found in Europe and Far Eastern Russia.

Species:
 Rhabdomiris pulcherrimus (Lindberg, 1934) 
 Rhabdomiris striatellus (Fabricius, 1794)

References

Miridae